The 2021–22 California Baptist Lancers men's basketball team represented California Baptist University in the 2021–22 NCAA Division I men's basketball season. The Lancers, led by ninth-year head coach Rick Croy, played their home games at the CBU Events Center in Riverside, California as members of the Western Athletic Conference.

The season marked CBU's final year of a four-year transition period from Division II to Division I. As a result, the Lancers were not eligible for NCAA postseason play, but could participate in the WAC tournament. They finished the regular season 17–14, 7–11 in WAC Play to finish in 9th place. They defeated Texas–Rio Grande Valley in the first round of the WAC Tournament before losing in the second round to Sam Houston State. 

The Lancers accepted an invitation to the College Basketball Invitational, where they lost to Middle Tennessee in the first round.

Previous season
In a season limited by the ongoing COVID-19 pandemic, the Lancers finished the 2020–21 season 13–10, 6–6 in WAC play to finish in fourth place. They lost to Seattle in the quarterfinals of the WAC tournament.

Roster

Schedule and results

|-
!colspan=12 style=| Non-conference season

|-
!colspan=12 style=|WAC conference season

|-
!colspan=9 style=|WAC tournament

|-
!colspan=9 style=|CBI

Source

See also 
 2021–22 California Baptist Lancers women's basketball team

References

California Baptist Lancers men's basketball seasons
California Baptist Lancers
California Baptist Lancers men's basketball
California Baptist Lancers men's basketball
California Baptist